There are about 1,400 known moth species of Uganda. The moths (mostly nocturnal) and butterflies (mostly diurnal) together make up the taxonomic order Lepidoptera.

This is a list of moth species which have been recorded in Uganda.

Alucitidae
Alucita dohertyi (Walsingham, 1909)
Alucita loxoschista (Meyrick, 1931)
Alucita molliflua (Meyrick, 1927)

Anomoeotidae
Staphylinochrous euryperalis Hampson, 1910
Staphylinochrous flavida Hampson, 1920
Staphylinochrous melanoleuca Hampson, 1910

Arctiidae
Acantharctia ansorgei Rothschild, 1910
Acantharctia atriramosa Hampson, 1907
Acantharctia aurivillii Bartel, 1903
Acantharctia flavicosta (Hampson, 1900)
Acantharctia latifusca (Hampson, 1907)
Acantharctia metaleuca Hampson, 1901
Acantharctia mundata (Walker, 1865)
Afraloa bifurca (Walker, 1855)
Afrasura hieroglyphica (Bethune-Baker, 1911)
Afrasura indecisa (Walker, 1869)
Afrasura neavi (Hampson, 1914)
Afrasura obliterata (Walker, 1864)
Afrasura peripherica (Strand, 1912)
Afrasura rivulosa (Walker, 1854)
Afrasura submarmorata (Kiriakoff, 1958)
Afrasura violacea (Cieslak & Häuser, 2006)
Afroarctia kenyana (Rothschild, 1933)
Afrospilarctia lucida (Druce, 1898)
Aglossosia flavimarginata Hampson, 1900
Alpenus investigatorum (Karsch, 1898)
Alpenus maculosa (Stoll, 1781)
Alpenus nigropunctata (Bethune-Baker, 1908)
Alpenus pardalina (Rothschild, 1910)
Alpenus schraderi (Rothschild, 1910)
Amata basithyris Hampson, 1914
Amata cerbera (Linnaeus, 1764)
Amata cuprizonata (Hampson, 1901)
Amata cyanea Hampson, 1914
Amata jacksoni Rothschild, 1910
Amata kenredi (Rothschild, 1910)
Amata marina (Butler, 1876)
Amata monothyris Hampson, 1914
Amata nigrobasalis Rothschild, 1910
Amata ntebi (Bethune-Baker, 1911)
Amata phaeobasis (Hampson, 1907)
Amata rubritincta (Hampson, 1903)
Amata tomasina (Butler, 1876)
Amata xanthopleura Hampson, 1914
Amerila atrivena (Hampson, 1907)
Amerila brunnea (Hampson, 1901)
Amerila bubo (Walker, 1855)
Amerila fuscivena (Hampson, 1916)
Amerila luteibarba (Hampson, 1901)
Amerila nigrivenosa (Grünberg, 1910)
Amerila niveivitrea (Bartel, 1903)
Amerila pannosa (Grünberg, 1908)
Amerila puella (Fabricius, 1793)
Amerila thermochroa (Hampson, 1916)
Amphicallia bellatrix (Dalman, 1823)
Amphicallia pactolicus (Butler, 1888)
Amphicallia thelwalli (Druce, 1882)
Anapisa endoxantha Hampson, 1914
Anapisa melaleuca (Holland, 1898)
Anapisa metarctioides (Hampson, 1907)
Apisa metarctiodes Hampson, 1907
Archilema cinderella (Kiriakoff, 1958)
Archilema modiolus (Kiriakoff, 1958)
Archithosia discors (Kiriakoff, 1958)
Archithosia tryphosa (Kiriakoff, 1858)
Argina amanda (Boisduval, 1847)
Argina leonina (Walker, 1865)
Asura friederikeae Kühne, 2007
Asura mutabilis Kühne, 2007
Asura pectinella Strand, 1922
Asura pinkurata Kühne, 2007
Asurgylla collenettei Kiriakoff, 1958
Balacra batesi Druce, 1910
Balacra compsa (Jordan, 1904)
Balacra diaphana Kiriakoff, 1957
Balacra elegans Aurivillius, 1892
Balacra flavimacula Walker, 1856
Balacra pulchra Aurivillius, 1892
Balacra rattrayi (Rothschild, 1910)
Balacra rubricincta Holland, 1893
Balacra rubrostriata (Aurivillius, 1892)
Binna scita (Walker, 1865)
Carcinarctia rufa Joicey & Talbot, 1921
Caripodia chrysargyria Hampson, 1900
Caryatis stenoperas Hampson, 1910
Ceryx cybelistes (Holland, 1893)
Ceryx semihyalina Kirby, 1896
Cragia adiastola (Kiriakoff, 1958)
Cragia distigmata (Hampson, 1901)
Cragia quadrinotata (Walker, 1864)
Creatonotos leucanioides Holland, 1893
Cyana flammeostrigata Karisch, 2003
Cyana margarethae (Kiriakoff, 1958)
Cyana rejecta (Walker, 1854)
Cyana ruwenzoriana Karisch, 2003
Cyana ugandana (Strand, 1912)
Disparctia varicolor Toulgoët, 1978
Disparctia vittata (Druce, 1898)
Dubatolovia neurophaea (Hampson, 1911)
Eilema debilissima Kiriakoff, 1958
Eilema gracilipennis (Wallengren, 1860)
Eilema mesosticta Hampson, 1911
Eilema rufitincta (Hampson, 1914)
Epilacydes bayoni (Berio, 1935)
Epitoxis albicincta Hampson, 1903
Epitoxis ansorgei Rothschild, 1910
Epitoxis procridia Hampson, 1898
Eressa africana Hampson, 1914
Estigmene ansorgei Rothschild, 1910
Estigmene ochreomarginata Bethune-Baker, 1909
Estigmene tenuistrigata (Hampson, 1900)
Euchromia guineensis (Fabricius, 1775)
Euchromia jacksoni Bethune-Baker, 1911
Eurozonosia fulvinigra Hampson, 1914
Exilisia tripuncta (Kiriakoff, 1958)
Eyralpenus scioana (Oberthür, 1880)
Galtara aurivilii (Pagenstecher, 1901)
Galtara doriae (Oberthür, 1880)
Galtara reticulata (Hampson, 1909)
Hippurarctia ferrigera (Druce, 1910)
Ilemodes astriga Hampson, 1916
Ilemodes heterogyna Hampson, 1900
Kiriakoffalia costimacula (Joicey & Talbot, 1924)
Lepista pandula (Boisduval, 1847)
Mecistorhabdia haematoessa (Holland, 1893)
Meganaclia sippia (Plötz, 1880)
Melisa hancocki Jordan, 1936
Metarctia burra (Schaus & Clements, 1893)
Metarctia flaviciliata Hampson, 1907
Metarctia flavicincta Aurivillius, 1900
Metarctia flavivena Hampson, 1901
Metarctia fulvia Hampson, 1901
Metarctia fusca Hampson, 1901
Metarctia haematica Holland, 1893
Metarctia lateritia Herrich-Schäffer, 1855
Metarctia pulverea Hampson, 1907
Metarctia pumila Hampson, 1909
Metarctia rubripuncta Hampson, 1898
Metarctia sarcosoma Hampson, 1901
Metarctia tricolorana Wichgraf, 1922
Micralarctia punctulatum (Wallengren, 1860)
Muxta xanthopa (Holland, 1893)
Myopsyche xanthosoma Hampson, 1907
Nacliodes microsippia Strand, 1912
Nanna eningae (Plötz, 1880)
Neuroxena ansorgei Kirby, 1896
Nyctemera apicalis (Walker, 1854)
Nyctemera chalcosidia (Hampson, 1910)
Nyctemera glauce (Fawcett, 1916)
Nyctemera itokina (Aurivillius, 1904)
Nyctemera leuconoe Hopffer, 1857
Nyctemera perspicua (Walker, 1854)
Nyctemera rattrayi (Swinhoe, 1904)
Nyctemera restrictum (Butler, 1894)
Nyctemera ugandicola (Strand, 1909)
Onychipodia straminea Hampson, 1914
Ovenna guineacola (Strand, 1912)
Ovenna vicaria (Walker, 1854)
Palaeosiccia major (Kiriakoff, 1958)
Paradoxosia rufipex Hampson, 1918
Paralacydes decemmaculata (Rothschild, 1916)
Paralpenus ugandae (Hampson, 1916)
Paramelisa lophura Aurivillius, 1905
Pericaliella melanodisca (Hampson, 1907)
Phryganopsis angulifascia (Strand, 1912)
Phryganopsis punctilineata (Hampson, 1901)
Phryganopsis tryphosa Kiriakoff, 1958
Popoudina pamphilia Kiriakoff, 1958
Pseudothyretes erubescens (Hampson, 1901)
Pseudothyretes kamitugensis (Dufrane, 1945)
Pseudothyretes perpusilla (Walker, 1856)
Pseudothyretes rubicundula (Strand, 1912)
Psichotoe rubridorsata Berio, 1940
Pusiola edwardsi (Kiriakoff, 1958)
Pusiola hemiphaea (Hampson, 1909)
Pusiola minutissima (Kiriakoff, 1958)
Pusiola poliosia (Kiriakoff, 1958)
Pusiola roscidella (Kiriakoff, 1954)
Pusiola sorghicolor (Kiriakoff, 1954)
Pusiola straminea (Hampson, 1901)
Pusiola tinaeella (Kiriakoff, 1958)
Radiarctia jacksoni (Rothschild, 1910)
Radiarctia lutescens (Walker, 1854)
Radiarctia rhodesiana (Hampson, 1900)
Rhabdomarctia rubrilineata (Bethune-Baker, 1911)
Rhipidarctia crameri Kiriakoff, 1961
Rhipidarctia forsteri (Kiriakoff, 1953)
Rhipidarctia pareclecta (Holland, 1893)
Secusio deilemera Talbot, 1929
Secusio drucei Rothschild, 1933
Secusio mania Druce, 1887
Secusio strigata Walker, 1854
Seydelia ellioti (Butler, 1895)
Siccia adiaphora Kiriakoff, 1958
Siccia cretata Hampson, 1914
Siccia duodecimpunctata Kiriakoff, 1958
Siccia pallens Hampson, 1918
Spilosoma atridorsia Hampson, 1920
Spilosoma curvilinea Walker, 1855
Spilosoma holoxantha (Hampson, 1907)
Spilosoma karschi Bartel, 1903
Spilosoma pales (Druce, 1910)
Spilosoma rava (Druce, 1898)
Spilosoma sublutescens Kiriakoff, 1958
Spilosoma sulphurea Bartel, 1903
Spilosoma unipuncta (Hampson, 1905)
Stenarctia abdominalis Rothschild, 1910
Stenarctia quadripunctata Aurivillius, 1900
Teracotona approximans (Rothschild, 1917)
Teracotona euprepia Hampson, 1900
Teracotona melanocera (Hampson, 1920)
Teracotona pardalina Bartel, 1903
Teracotona translucens (Grünberg, 1907)
Teracotona wittei (Debauche, 1942)
Tesma melema (Kiriakoff, 1958)
Thumatha kakamegae Kühne, 2007
Utetheisa pulchella (Linnaeus, 1758)

Brahmaeidae
Dactyloceras lucina (Drury, 1872)

Carposinidae
Carposina euschema Bradley, 1965
Carposina mesophaea Bradley, 1965
Carposina poliophara Bradley, 1965
Carposina scierotoxa Meyrick, 1924

Choreutidae
Brenthia gamicopis Meyrick, 1930
Choreutis aegyptiaca (Zeller, 1867)
Choreutis agelasta Bradley, 1965
Choreutis pychnomochla Bradley, 1965

Cosmopterigidae
Anatrachyntis rileyi (Walsingham, 1882)

Cossidae
Azygophleps albovittata Bethune-Baker, 1908
Azygophleps mediopallens D. S. Fletcher, 1968
Azygophleps nubilosa Hampson, 1910

Crambidae
Adelpherupa flavescens Hampson, 1919
Aethaloessa floridalis (Zeller, 1852)
Agathodes musivalis Guenée, 1854
Ancylolomia chrysographellus (Kollar, 1844)
Ancylolomia fulvitinctalis Hampson, 1919
Ancylolomia perfasciata Hampson, 1919
Bissetia poliella (Hampson, 1919)
Cadarena sinuata (Fabricius, 1781)
Calamoschoena nigripunctalis Hampson, 1919
Chilo mesoplagalis (Hampson, 1919)
Cnaphalocrocis trapezalis (Guenée, 1854)
Cotachena smaragdina (Butler, 1875)
Diasemia lunalis Gaede, 1916
Donacaula rufalis (Hampson, 1919)
Glyphodes aniferalis Hampson, 1909
Glyphodes stolalis Guenée, 1854
Haimbachia subterminalis (Hampson, 1919)
Palpita metallata (Fabricius, 1781)
Palpita unionalis (Hübner, 1796)
Patissa fractilinealis Hampson, 1919
Patissa fulvicepsalis Hampson, 1919
Patissa fulvipunctalis Hampson, 1919
Patissa geminalis Hampson, 1919
Pediasia melanerges (Hampson, 1919)
Pilocrocis laralis Hampson, 1909
Pilocrocis patagialis Hampson, 1909
Pilocrocis pterygodia Hampson, 1912
Polygrammodes phyllophila (Butler, 1878)
Polythlipta distinguenda Grünberg, 1910
Polythlipta guttiferalis Hampson, 1909
Psara bipunctalis (Fabricius, 1794)
Psara cryptolepis (Martin, 1956)
Pyrausta fulvilinealis Hampson, 1918
Pyrausta gazalis Hampson, 1913
Stemorrhages sericea (Drury, 1773)
Stenocalama ochrotis Hampson, 1919
Syllepte nyanzana (Grünberg, 1910)
Syllepte ovialis (Walker, 1859)
Zebronia phenice (Cramer, 1780)

Drepanidae
Epicampoptera andersoni (Tams, 1925)
Epicampoptera heterogyna (Hampson, 1914)
Epicampoptera marantica (Tams, 1930)
Epicampoptera strandi Bryk, 1913
Gonoreta albiapex Watson, 1965
Gonoreta angulosa Watson, 1965
Gonoreta cymba Watson, 1965
Gonoreta forcipulata Watson, 1965
Gonoreta opacifinis Watson, 1965
Isospidia angustipennis (Warren, 1904)
Negera natalensis (Felder, 1874)
Negera quadricornis Watson, 1965
Negera ramosa Watson, 1965
Spidia fenestrata Butler, 1878
Spidia goniata Watson, 1957
Spidia smithi (Warren, 1902)
Uranometra oculata (Holland, 1893)

Elachistidae
Elachista iriphaea (Meyrick, 1932)
Elachista oritropha Bradley, 1965

Eupterotidae
Hoplojana roseobrunnea Rothschild, 1917
Janomima dannfelti (Aurivillius, 1893)
Phiala nigrolineata Aurivillius, 1903
Phiala novemlineata Aurivillius, 1911
Stenoglene roseus (Druce, 1886)
Vianga crowleyi (Aurivillius, 1904)

Gelechiidae
Brachmia deltopis Meyrick, 1920
Platyedra cunctatrix Meyrick, 1931
Ptilothyris serangota Meyrick, 1932

Geometridae
Acanthovalva inconspicuaria (Hübner, 1796)
Acollesis umbrata Warren, 1899
Aletis erici Kirby, 1896
Aletis helcita (Linnaeus, 1763)
Ansorgia divergens Warren, 1899
Antitrygodes callibotrys Prout, 1918
Aphilopota calaria (Swinhoe, 1904)
Aphilopota fletcheri Carcasson, 1965
Archichlora ansorgei (Warren, 1901)
Asthenotricha anisobapta Prout, 1932
Asthenotricha ansorgei Warren, 1899
Asthenotricha barnsae Prout, 1935
Asthenotricha flavicoma Warren, 1899
Asthenotricha inutilis Warren, 1901
Asthenotricha proschora D. S. Fletcher, 1958
Asthenotricha pycnoconia Janse, 1933
Asthenotricha semidivisa Warren, 1901
Asthenotricha serraticornis Warren, 1902
Azyx consocia (Warren, 1899)
Biston abruptaria (Walker, 1869)
Biston edwardsi (Prout, 1938)
Biston gloriosaria Karisch, 2005
Blaboplutodes parvistictus Carcasson, 1965
Cancellalata subumbrata D. S. Fletcher, 1956
Cartaletis libyssa (Hopffer, 1857)
Cartaletis variabilis (Butler, 1878)
Centrochria aphthona (Prout, 1934)
Chiasmia anguifera (Prout, 1934)
Chiasmia assimilis (Warren, 1899)
Chiasmia brongusaria (Walker, 1860)
Chiasmia confuscata (Warren, 1899)
Chiasmia curvilineata (Warren, 1899)
Chiasmia dentilineata (Warren, 1899)
Chiasmia fulvimargo (Warren, 1899)
Chiasmia geminilinea (Prout, 1932)
Chiasmia gyliura (Prout, 1932)
Chiasmia maculosa (Warren, 1899)
Chiasmia nana (Warren, 1898)
Chiasmia observata (Walker, 1861)
Chiasmia pervittata (Hampson, 1909)
Chiasmia procidata (Guenée, 1858)
Chiasmia rectistriaria (Herrich-Schäffer, 1854)
Chiasmia semicolor (Warren, 1899)
Chiasmia subcretata (Warren, 1905)
Chiasmia subcurvaria (Mabille, 1897)
Chiasmia trizonaria (Hampson, 1909)
Chiasmia umbrata (Warren, 1897)
Chiasmia umbratilis (Butler, 1875)
Chiasmia unifilata (Warren, 1899)
Chlorodrepana allevata Prout, 1915
Cleora rostella D. S. Fletcher, 1967
Coenina aurivena Butler, 1898
Colocleora ankolensis Carcasson, 1965
Colocleora hegemonica (Prout, 1932)
Colocleora simulatrix (Warren, 1899)
Comibaena biviaria Hampson, 1909
Comostolopsis rubristicta (Warren, 1899)
Comostolopsis tmematica Prout, 1934
Conolophia rectistrigaria Rebel, 1914
Derambila hyperphyes (Prout, 1911)
Disclisioprocta natalata (Walker, 1862)
Dithecodes brunneifrons (Hampson, 1909)
Dithecodes delicata (Warren, 1899)
Ecpetala carnifasciata (Warren, 1899)
Ecpetala indentata (Warren, 1902)
Ecpetala meridionata Walker, 1862
Ecpetala obtusa (Warren, 1902)
Ectropis anisa Prout, 1915
Ectropis ocellata Warren, 1902
Encoma irisaria Swinhoe, 1904
Eois grataria (Walker, 1861)
Eois laxipecten Herbulot, 2000
Epicosymbia spectrum Prout, 1923
Epigynopteryx curvimargo (Hampson, 1909)
Epigynopteryx flavedinaria (Guenée, 1857)
Epigynopteryx impunctata (Warren, 1898)
Epigynopteryx nigricola (Warren, 1897)
Epigynopteryx stictigramma (Hampson, 1909)
Epigynopteryx subspersa (Warren, 1897)
Epigynopteryx tabitha Warren, 1901
Epigynopteryx termininota Prout, 1934
Erastria albosignata (Walker, 1863)
Erastria madecassaria (Boisduval, 1833)
Eupithecia celatisigna (Warren, 1902)
Eupithecia connexa (Warren, 1899)
Eupithecia devestita (Warren, 1899)
Eupithecia dilucida (Warren, 1899)
Eupithecia dohertyi Prout, 1935
Eupithecia edwardsi D. S. Fletcher, 1951
Eupithecia fuscata D. S. Fletcher, 1951
Eupithecia nigropolata D. S. Fletcher, 1951
Eupithecia ochrata D. S. Fletcher, 1951
Eupithecia rigida Swinhoe, 1892
Eupithecia semipallida Janse, 1933
Eupithecia tricuspis Prout, 1932
Eupithecia undiculata Prout, 1932
Geodena ansorgei (Warren, 1899)
Geodena discinota (Warren, 1899)
Geodena disticta (Bethune-Baker, 1909)
Geodena funesta (Warren, 1899)
Geodena monostigma Hampson, 1910
Geodena venata Prout, 1915
Heterorachis carpenteri Prout, 1915
Horisme pallidimacula Prout, 1925
Hydrelia argyridia (Butler, 1894)
Hylemeridia nigricosta Prout, 1915
Hypochrosis banakaria (Plötz, 1880)
Hypochrosis glaucaria Hampson, 1909
Hypochrosis maculifera Hampson, 1909
Hypocoela subfulva Warren, 1897
Hypocoela turpisaria (Swinhoe, 1904)
Idaea amputata (Warren, 1899)
Idaea prucholoma (Prout, 1932)
Idaea subscutulata (Warren, 1899)
Idiodes flexilinea (Warren, 1898)
Isoplenodia kisubiensis Sihvonen & Staude, 2010
Isturgia deerraria (Walker, 1861)
Isturgia exospilata (Walker, 1861)
Isturgia presbitaria (Swinhoe, 1904)
Lathochlora perversa Prout, 1915
Mauna diasporas Prout, 1932
Medasina ugandaria (Swinhoe, 1904)
Megadrepana cinerea Holland, 1893
Melinoessa aemonia (Swinhoe, 1904)
Melinoessa perlimbata (Guenée, 1857)
Melinoessa sodaliata (Walker, 1862)
Melinoessa subalbida Warren, 1905
Melinoessa tanyglochis Prout, 1928
Menophra aborta (Warren, 1898)
Mimaletis reducta Prout, 1915
Mimoclystia cancellata (Warren, 1899)
Mimoclystia euthygramma (Prout, 1921)
Mimoclystia thermochroa (Hampson, 1909)
Narthecusa perplexata (Walker, 1862)
Nothofidonia ansorgei (Warren, 1901)
Oaracta maculata (Warren, 1897)
Omphacodes divergens (Warren, 1899)
Omphalucha brunnea (Warren, 1899)
Pachypalpella subalbata (Warren, 1900)
Piercia ansorgei (Bethune-Baker, 1913)
Piercia chlorostola (Hampson, 1909)
Piercia subrufaria (Warren, 1903)
Pigiopsis convergens Warren, 1899
Pingasa distensaria (Walker, 1860)
Pitthea continua Walker, 1854
Pitthea cyanomeris Prout, 1915
Pitthea trifasciata Dewitz, 1881
Prasinocyma centralis Prout, 1915
Prasinocyma congrua (Walker, 1869)
Prasinocyma immaculata (Thunberg, 1784)
Prasinocyma nigrimacula Prout, 1915
Prasinocyma nigripunctata (Warren, 1897)
Prasinocyma oculata Prout, 1915
Prasinocyma rubrimacula (Warren, 1899)
Prasinocyma stictoloma Prout, 1928
Problepsis aegretta Felder & Rogenhofer, 1875
Problepsis digammata Kirby, 1896
Protosteira spectabilis (Warren, 1899)
Pseudolarentia megalaria (Guenée, 1858)
Pseudolarentia monosticta (Butler, 1894)
Pseudosoloe thalassina (Warren, 1909)
Psilocerea pulverosa (Warren, 1894)
Racotis angulosa Herbulot, 1973
Rhodophthitus roseovittata (Butler, 1895)
Rhodophthitus tricoloraria (Mabille, 1890)
Scopula agrapta (Warren, 1902)
Scopula albida (Warren, 1899)
Scopula ansorgei (Warren, 1899)
Scopula elegans (Prout, 1915)
Scopula fuscobrunnea (Warren, 1901)
Scopula improba (Warren, 1899)
Scopula internataria (Walker, 1861)
Scopula luxipuncta Prout, 1932
Scopula ochreofusa (Warren, 1899)
Scopula plionocentra Prout, 1920
Scopula pulchellata (Fabricius, 1794)
Scopula serena Prout, 1920
Scopula silonaria (Guenée, 1858)
Scopula subpectinata (Prout, 1915)
Scopula suda Prout, 1932
Scopula supina Prout, 1920
Scopula tenera (Warren, 1899)
Scopula tricommata (Warren, 1899)
Somatina figurata Warren, 1897
Somatina virginalis Prout, 1917
Syndromodes invenusta (Wallengren, 1863)
Terina chrysoptera Hampson, 1909
Terina doleris (Plötz, 1880)
Thalassodes albifimbria Warren, 1897
Traminda acuta (Warren, 1897)
Traminda drepanodes Prout, 1915
Trimetopia aetheraria Guenée, 1858
Victoria fuscithorax Warren, 1905
Xanthisthisa tarsispina (Warren, 1901)
Xanthorhoe alluaudi (Prout, 1932)
Xanthorhoe ansorgei (Warren, 1899)
Xanthorhoe conchata Warren, 1898
Xanthorhoe exorista Prout, 1922
Xanthorhoe heliopharia (Swinhoe, 1904)
Xanthorhoe heteromorpha (Hampson, 1909)
Xanthorhoe procne (Fawcett, 1916)
Xanthorhoe tamsi D. S. Fletcher, 1963
Xanthorhoe transcissa (Warren, 1902)
Xanthorhoe transjugata Prout, 1923
Xanthorhoe trientata (Warren, 1901)
Xenimpia angusta Prout, 1915
Xenostega fallax Warren, 1899
Xenostega irrorata Prout, 1915
Xylopteryx prasinaria Hampson, 1909
Zamarada acalantis Herbulot, 2001
Zamarada acosmeta Prout, 1921
Zamarada adumbrata D. S. Fletcher, 1974
Zamarada amicta Prout, 1915
Zamarada amymone Prout, 1934
Zamarada ariste D. S. Fletcher, 1974
Zamarada astales D. S. Fletcher, 1974
Zamarada bastelbergeri Gaede, 1915
Zamarada bonaberiensis Strand, 1915
Zamarada candelabra D. S. Fletcher, 1974
Zamarada carcassoni D. S. Fletcher, 1974
Zamarada chrysothyra Hampson, 1909
Zamarada clenchi D. S. Fletcher, 1974
Zamarada collarti Debauche, 1938
Zamarada consummata D. S. Fletcher, 1974
Zamarada crystallophana Mabille, 1900
Zamarada cucharita D. S. Fletcher, 1974
Zamarada cydippe Herbulot, 1954
Zamarada deceptrix Warren, 1914
Zamarada delta D. S. Fletcher, 1974
Zamarada dentata D. S. Fletcher, 1958
Zamarada dentigera Warren, 1909
Zamarada differens Bastelberger, 1907
Zamarada erosa D. S. Fletcher, 1974
Zamarada euerces Prout, 1928
Zamarada euphrosyne Oberthür, 1912
Zamarada excavata Bethune-Baker, 1913
Zamarada exigua D. S. Fletcher, 1974
Zamarada flavicosta Warren, 1897
Zamarada gamma D. S. Fletcher, 1958
Zamarada ignicosta Prout, 1912
Zamarada latimargo Warren, 1897
Zamarada lepta D. S. Fletcher, 1974
Zamarada longidens D. S. Fletcher, 1963
Zamarada melanopyga Herbulot, 1954
Zamarada melpomene Oberthür, 1912
Zamarada metrioscaphes Prout, 1912
Zamarada nasuta Warren, 1897
Zamarada ostracodes D. S. Fletcher, 1974
Zamarada paxilla D. S. Fletcher, 1974
Zamarada pelobasis D. S. Fletcher, 1974
Zamarada phaeozona Hampson, 1909
Zamarada phoenopasta D. S. Fletcher, 1974
Zamarada prolata D. S. Fletcher, 1974
Zamarada radula D. S. Fletcher, 1974
Zamarada reflexaria (Walker, 1863)
Zamarada rufilinearia Swinhoe, 1904
Zamarada setosa D. S. Fletcher, 1974
Zamarada sicula D. S. Fletcher, 1974
Zamarada terpsichore Oberthür, 1912
Zamarada townsendi D. S. Fletcher, 1974
Zamarada variola D. S. Fletcher, 1974
Zamarada vigilans Prout, 1915
Zamarada vulpina Warren, 1897

Glyphipterigidae
Irinympha aglaograpta Meyrick, 1932

Gracillariidae
Acrocercops bifasciata (Walsingham, 1891)
Acrocercops chenopa Meyrick, 1932
Acrocercops coloptila Meyrick, 1937
Acrocercops orianassa Meyrick, 1932
Aristaea bathracma (Meyrick, 1912)
Caloptilia janeae Bradley, 1965
Caloptilia octopunctata (Turner, 1894)
Caloptilia pachyspila Bradley, 1965
Conopomorpha fustigera (Meyrick, 1928)
Corythoxestis aletreuta (Meyrick, 1936)
Metriochroa celidota Bradley, 1965
Phyllocnistis loxosticha Bradley, 1965
Phyllonorycter fletcheri de Prins, 2012
Phyllonorycter loxozona (Meyrick, 1936)
Phyllonorycter ruwenzori de Prins, 2012
Polysoma lithochrysa (Meyrick, 1930)

Himantopteridae
Doratopteryx zopheropa Bethune-Baker, 1911
Pedoptila catori Bethune-Baker, 1911

Lasiocampidae
Anadiasa fuscofasciata (Aurivillius, 1922)
Beralade continua Aurivillius, 1905
Braura elgonensis (Kruck, 1940)
Catalebeda tamsi Hering, 1932
Cheligium choerocampoides (Holland, 1893)
Epicnapteroides lobata Strand, 1912
Eutricha morosa (Walker, 1865)
Euwallengrenia reducta (Walker, 1855)
Filiola lanceolata (Hering, 1932)
Gastroplakaeis meridionalis Aurivillius, 1901
Gelo joannoui Zolotuhin & Prozorov, 2010
Gelo jordani (Tams, 1936)
Gonometa nysa Druce, 1887
Gonometa podocarpi Aurivillius, 1925
Gonometa regia Aurivillius, 1905
Grellada imitans (Aurivillius, 1893)
Lechriolepis griseola Aurivillius, 1927
Lechriolepis jacksoni (Bethune-Baker, 1911)
Lechriolepis leucostigma (Hampson, 1909)
Lechriolepis ochraceola Strand, 1912
Lechriolepis tessmanni Strand, 1912
Leipoxais batesi Bethune-Baker, 1927
Leipoxais humfreyi Aurivillius, 1915
Leipoxais marginepunctata Holland, 1893
Leipoxais peraffinis Holland, 1893
Leipoxais proboscidea (Guérin-Méneville, 1832)
Leipoxais rufobrunnea Strand, 1912
Leipoxais siccifolia Aurivillius, 1902
Leipoxais tamsi D. S. Fletcher, 1968
Mallocampa audea (Druce, 1887)
Mallocampa leucophaea (Holland, 1893)
Mimopacha bryki Aurivillius, 1927
Mimopacha cinerascens (Holland, 1893)
Mimopacha gerstaeckerii (Dewitz, 1881)
Mimopacha tripunctata (Aurivillius, 1905)
Morongea arnoldi (Aurivillius, 1909)
Odontocheilopteryx corvus Gurkovich & Zolotuhin, 2009
Odontocheilopteryx maculata Aurivillius, 1905
Odontocheilopteryx myxa Wallengren, 1860
Odontocheilopteryx pattersoni Tams, 1926
Odontogama nigricans Aurivillius, 1914
Opisthodontia sonithella Zolotuhin & Prozorov, 2010
Opisthodontia supramalis Zolotuhin & Prozorov, 2010
Opisthodontia varezhka Zolotuhin & Prozorov, 2010
Opisthoheza heza Zolotuhin & Prozorov, 2010
Pachymeta contraria (Walker, 1855)
Pachymeta immunda (Holland, 1893)
Pachymetana guttata (Aurivillius, 1914)
Pachyna subfascia (Walker, 1855)
Pachytrina gliharta Zolotuhin & Gurkovich, 2009
Pachytrina honrathii (Dewitz, 1881)
Pachytrina philargyria (Hering, 1928)
Pachytrina trilineata (Aurivillius, 1911)
Pallastica litlura Zolotuhin & Gurukovich, 2009
Pallastica meloui (Riel, 1909)
Philotherma jacchus Möschler, 1887
Philotherma leucocyma (Hampson, 1909)
Philotherma sordida Aurivillius, 1905
Philotherma thoracica (Butler, 1895)
Pseudolyra cervina (Aurivillius, 1905)
Pseudolyra parva Tams, 1931
Pseudometa andersoni Tams, 1925
Pseudometa castanea Hampson, 1909
Pseudometa choba (Druce, 1899)
Pseudometa pagetodes Tams, 1929
Sena strigifascia (Hampson, 1909)
Sonitha lila Zolotuhin & Prozorov, 2010
Sonitha myoctona Zolotuhin & Prozorov, 2010
Stenophatna tamsi (Kiriakoff, 1963)
Stoermeriana eccrita D. S. Fletcher, 1968
Stoermeriana fusca (Aurivillius, 1905)
Stoermeriana graberi (Dewitz, 1881)
Stoermeriana ocellata Tams, 1929
Stoermeriana sjostedti (Aurivillius, 1902)
Stoermeriana tessmanni (Strand, 1912)
Streblote butiti (Bethune-Baker, 1906)
Streblote diplocyma (Hampson, 1909)
Trabala charon Druce, 1910
Trabala prasinophena Tams, 1931

Limacodidae
Coenobasis amoena Felder, 1874
Halseyia latifascia (Hering, 1937)
Halseyia rufilinea (Bethune-Baker, 1909)
Halseyia tenuifascia (Hering, 1937)
Halseyia ugandensis (Hering, 1937)
Latoia viridicosta (Hampson, 1910)
Macroplectra cinnamomea West, 1940
Macroplectra fuscifusa Hampson, 1910
Macroplectra jacksoni West, 1937
Macroplectra mesocyma Hampson, 1910
Macroplectra obliquilinea Hampson, 1910
Macroplectra rufopallens Hampson, 1910
Narosa hedychroa (Bethune-Baker, 1909)
Parapluda incincta (Hampson, 1909)
Parapluda invitabilis (Wallengren, 1860)
Parasa hexamitobalia Tams, 1930
Parasa parva Hering, 1938
Tetraphleba ruficeps (Hampson, 1909)

Lymantriidae
Aroa interrogationis Collenette, 1938
Bracharoa quadripunctata (Wallengren, 1875)
Carpenterella chionobosca Collenette, 1960
Collenettema crocipes (Boisduval, 1833)
Conigephyra sericaria (Hering, 1926)
Creagra atricosta (Hampson, 1909)
Crorema evanescens (Hampson, 1910)
Crorema fuscinotata (Hampson, 1910)
Dasychira aeschra (Hampson, 1926)
Dasychira glovera (Swinhoe, 1906)
Dasychira nigroplagata (Bethune-Baker, 1913)
Dasychira phoca Hampson, 1910
Dyasma thaumatopoeides (Schultze, 1934)
Eudasychira geoffreyi (Bethune-Baker, 1913)
Eudasychira quinquepunctata Möschler, 1887
Eudasychira umbrensis (Bethune-Baker, 1913)
Euproctis aethiopica (Bethune-Baker, 1908)
Euproctis aplegia Collenette, 1953
Euproctis audeoudi Collenette, 1938
Euproctis bigutta Holland, 1893
Euproctis carcassoni Collenette, 1960
Euproctis ceramozona Collenette, 1931
Euproctis coniorta Collenette, 1960
Euproctis conizona Collenette, 1933
Euproctis croceisticta Hampson, 1909
Euproctis disticta Bethune-Baker, 1909
Euproctis melalepia Hampson, 1909
Euproctis nessa Swinhoe, 1903
Euproctis perpusilla Hering, 1926
Euproctis pygmaea (Walker, 1855)
Euproctis ugandicola Strand, 1911
Homoeomeria hololeuca (Hampson, 1910)
Jacksoniana striata (Collenette, 1937)
Lacipa flavitincta Hampson, 1910
Lacipa gemmata Distant, 1897
Lacipa heterosticta Hampson, 1910
Lacipa melanosticta Hampson, 1910
Lacipa sundara (Swinhoe, 1903)
Laelia acuta Bethune-Baker, 1913
Laelia aethiopica Bethune-Baker, 1908
Laelia bethuneana Strand, 1914
Laelia diascia Hampson, 1905
Laelia extorta (Distant, 1897)
Laelia gigantea Hampson, 1910
Laelia rivularis Hampson, 1910
Leucoma costalis Swinhoe, 1906
Leucoma discissa (Grünberg, 1910)
Marblepsis kakamega Collenette, 1937
Mylantria xanthospila (Plötz, 1880)
Naroma nigrolunata Collenette, 1931
Naroma signifera Walker, 1856
Orgyia hopkinsi Collenette, 1937
Orgyia nigrocristata Joicey & Talbot, 1924
Otroeda hesperia (Cramer, 1779)
Paraxena esquamata Bethune-Baker, 1911
Pseudarctia nivea Bethune-Baker, 1911
Pseudobazisa sericea (Hampson, 1910)
Rahona ladburyi (Bethune-Baker, 1911)
Rhypopteryx psoloconiama Collenette, 1960
Sphragista basipuncta Joicey & Talbot, 1924
Stilpnaroma melanocera (Hampson, 1909)
Stracena kamengo Collenette, 1936
Stracena promelaena (Holland, 1893)
Stracena striata Schultze, 1934
Tamsita habrotima (Tams, 1930)
Tamsita ochthoeba (Hampson, 1920)

Metarbelidae
Haberlandia entebbeensis Lehmann, 2011
Metarbela simillima (Hampson, 1910)
Metarbelodes obliqualinea (Bethune-Baker, 1909)
Mountelgonia arcifera (Hampson, 1909)
Mountelgonia percivali Lehmann, 2013
Paralebedella estherae Lehmann, 2008
Salagena arcys D. S. Fletcher, 1968
Shimonia splendida (D. S. Fletcher, 1968)

Noctuidae
Ableptina nephelopera (Hampson, 1909)
Aburina phoenocrosmena Hampson, 1926
Achaea albifimbria (Walker, 1869)
Achaea boris (Geyer, 1837)
Achaea catella Guenée, 1852
Achaea catocaloides Guenée, 1852
Achaea cupreitincta Hampson, 1918
Achaea finita (Guenée, 1852)
Achaea lienardi (Boisduval, 1833)
Achaea phaeobasis Hampson, 1913
Achaea sordida (Walker, 1865)
Acontia buchanani (Rothschild, 1921)
Acontia citrelinea Bethune-Baker, 1911
Acontia hemixanthia (Hampson, 1910)
Acontia holoxantha (Hampson, 1910)
Acontia insocia (Walker, 1857)
Acontia natalis (Guenée, 1852)
Acontia niphogona (Hampson, 1909)
Acontia secta Guenée, 1852
Acontia veroxanthia Hacker, Legrain & Fibiger, 2010
Acontia wahlbergi Wallengren, 1856
Acrapex brunnea Hampson, 1910
Acrapex spoliata (Walker, 1863)
Aegocera obliqua Mabille, 1893
Aegocera rectilinea Boisduval, 1836
Aegocera tigrina (Druce, 1882)
Aletia phaeopasta (Hampson, 1907)
Aletia pyrausta (Hampson, 1913)
Amazonides elaeopis (Hampson, 1907)
Amblyprora acholi (Bethune-Baker, 1906)
Amyna axis Guenée, 1852
Amyna punctum (Fabricius, 1794)
Anomis benitensis (Holland, 1894)
Anomis erosa (Hübner, 1818)
Anomis leucosema Hampson, 1926
Anomis luperca Möschler, 1883
Anomis sabulifera (Guenée, 1852)
Apaegocera aurantipennis Hampson, 1912
Arboricornus chrysopepla (Hampson, 1908)
Ariathisa semiluna (Hampson, 1909)
Asota speciosa (Drury, 1773)
Aspidifrontia bussindii Berio, 1937
Athetis nitens (Saalmüller, 1891)
Athetis transversistriata Strand, 1911
Audea paulumnodosa Kühne, 2005
Autoba costimacula (Saalmüller, 1880)
Axylia rhodopea (Hampson, 1907)
Bareia incidens Walker, 1858
Busseola obliquifascia (Hampson, 1909)
Carpostalagma pulverulentus Talbot, 1929
Carpostalagma viridis (Plötz, 1880)
Catada phaeopasta Hampson, 1909
Catephia iridocosma (Bethune-Baker, 1911)
Charitosemia geraldi (Kirby, 1896)
Chrysodeixis acuta (Walker, [1858])
Chrysodeixis chalcites (Esper, 1789)
Claterna gracillodina Hampson, 1926
Corgatha ochrida Hampson, 1918
Cortyta polycyma (Hampson, 1909)
Crameria amabilis (Drury, 1773)
Ctenoplusia fracta (Walker, 1857)
Ctenoplusia limbirena (Guenée, 1852)
Ctenoplusia phocea (Hampson, 1910)
Cucullia perstriata Hampson, 1906
Cyligramma amblyops Mabille, 1891
Cyligramma fluctuosa (Drury, 1773)
Cyligramma latona (Cramer, 1775)
Cyligramma limacina (Guérin-Méneville, 1832)
Cyligramma magus (Guérin-Méneville, [1844])
Cyligramma simplex Grünberg, 1910
Diascia nubilata (Hampson, 1909)
Digama budonga Bethune-Baker, 1913
Digama rileyi (Kiriakoff, 1958)
Diparopsis castanea Hampson, 1902
Dysgonia algira (Linnaeus, 1767)
Dysgonia angularis (Boisduval, 1833)
Dysgonia conjunctura (Walker, 1858)
Dysgonia derogans (Walker, 1858)
Dysgonia prorasigna (Hampson, 1913)
Dysgonia torrida (Guenée, 1852)
Ectolopha viridescens Hampson, 1902
Egybolis vaillantina (Stoll, 1790)
Elyptron ethiopica (Hampson, 1909)
Erebus atavistis (Hampson, 1913)
Erebus macrops (Linnaeus, 1767)
Erebus walkeri (Butler, 1875)
Ericeia inangulata (Guenée, 1852)
Ericeia lituraria (Saalmüller, 1880)
Ethiopica acrothecta D. S. Fletcher, 1961
Ethiopica eclecta D. S. Fletcher, 1961
Ethiopica glauchroa D. S. Fletcher, 1961
Eublemma foedosa (Guenée, 1852)
Eublemma misturata Hampson, 1910
Eublemma ragusana (Freyer, 1844)
Eudocima divitiosa (Walker, 1869)
Eudocima fullonia (Clerck, 1764)
Eudocima materna (Linnaeus, 1767)
Eudrapa mollis Walker, 1857
Eutelia discitriga Walker, 1865
Euxootera leucoplaga (Hampson, 1907)
Feliniopsis politzari Hacker & Fibiger, 2007
Feliniopsis subsagula (D. S. Fletcher, 1961)
Gesonia stictigramma Hampson, 1926
Gracilodes nyctichroa Hampson, 1926
Grammodes geometrica (Fabricius, 1775)
Grammodes stolida (Fabricius, 1775)
Helicoverpa zea (Boddie, 1850)
Heliocheilus multiradiata (Hampson, 1902)
Heraclia aemulatrix (Westwood, 1881)
Heraclia aisha (Kirby, 1891)
Heraclia atrifusa (Hampson, 1912)
Heraclia gruenbergi (Wichgraf, 1911)
Heraclia hornimani (Druce, 1880)
Heraclia hypercompoides (Butler, 1895)
Heraclia karschi (Holland, 1897)
Heraclia longipennis (Walker, 1854)
Heraclia monslunensis (Hampson, 1901)
Heraclia poggei (Dewitz, 1879)
Heraclia superba (Butler, 1875)
Hypena obacerralis Walker, 1859
Hypena recurvata Hampson, 1909
Hypocala deflorata (Fabricius, 1794)
Hypopyra capensis Herrich-Schäffer, 1854
Leucania melanostrota (Hampson, 1905)
Leucania melianoides Möschler, 1883
Leucania sarca Hampson, 1902
Leucania tacuna Felder & Rogenhofer, 1874
Loxioda ochrota (Hampson, 1909)
Manga melanodonta (Hampson, 1910)
Marathyssa cuneata (Saalmüller, 1891)
Marcipa aequatorialis Pelletier, 1975
Marcipa pinheyi Pelletier, 1975
Marcipalina hayesi (Pelletier, 1975)
Masalia bimaculata (Moore, 1888)
Masalia flavistrigata (Hampson, 1903)
Masalia galatheae (Wallengren, 1856)
Masalia latinigra (Hampson, 1907)
Massaga maritona Butler, 1868
Maxera brachypecten Hampson, 1926
Maxera nigriceps (Walker, 1858)
Mentaxya albifrons (Geyer, 1837)
Mentaxya ignicollis (Walker, 1857)
Metagarista maenas (Herrich-Schäffer, 1853)
Metagarista triphaenoides Walker, 1854
Metatacha excavata (Bethune-Baker, 1909)
Miniodes discolor Guenée, 1852
Miniodes maculifera Hampson, 1913
Mitrophrys ansorgei (Rothschild, 1897)
Mitrophrys menete (Cramer, 1775)
Mocis frugalis (Fabricius, 1775)
Mocis mayeri (Boisduval, 1833)
Mocis mutuaria (Walker, 1858)
Mocis repanda (Fabricius, 1794)
Mocis undata (Fabricius, 1775)
Nyodes brevicornis (Walker, 1857)
Oligia ambigua (Walker, 1858)
Oligia parathermes Bethune-Baker, 1911
Omphalestra semifusca (Hampson, 1905)
Omphaloceps triangularis (Mabille, 1893)
Ophiusa cancellata (Saalmüller, 1891)
Ophiusa conspicienda (Walker, 1858)
Ophiusa violisparsa (L. B. Prout, 1919)
Oraesia emarginata (Fabricius, 1794)
Ozarba diaphora Berio, 1937
Ozarba hypoxantha (Wallengren, 1860)
Ozarba rosescens Hampson, 1910
Ozarba semitorrida Hampson, 1916
Ozarba subtilimba Berio, 1963
Pandesma quenavadi Guenée, 1852
Parachalciope agonia Hampson, 1913
Parachalciope binaria (Holland, 1894)
Parachalciope longiplaga Hampson, 1913
Parachalciope monoplaneta Hampson, 1913
Paralephana westi D. S. Fletcher, 1961
Pericyma scandulata (Felder & Rogenhofer, 1874)
Perigea ethiopica Hampson, 1908
Phaegorista leucomelas (Herrich-Schäffer, 1855)
Phaegorista similis Walker, 1869
Phaegorista trialbata Prout, 1918
Phaeoscia canipars Hampson, 1926
Plecoptera dentilinea Hampson, 1926
Plecoptera diplogramma Hampson, 1926
Plecoptera melanoscia Hampson, 1926
Plecopterodes melliflua (Holland, 1897)
Pleuronodes anconia Hampson, 1926
Pleuronodes lepticyma (Hampson, 1909)
Plusia aranea Hampson, 1909
Poeonoma serrata (Hampson, 1910)
Polydesma umbricola Boisduval, 1833
Prospalta sessei (Berio, 1937)
Pseudcraspedia punctata Hampson, 1898
Pseudoarcte melanis (Mabille, 1890)
Pseudotuerta argyrochlora (Carcasson, 1964)
Remigiodes remigina (Mabille, 1884)
Rhanidophora agrippa Druce, 1899
Rhanidophora flava Bethune-Baker, 1911
Rhanidophora phedonia (Stoll, 1781)
Rhanidophora piguerator Hampson, 1926
Rothia rhaeo (Druce, 1894)
Sarothroceras banaka (Plötz, 1880)
Sciatta inconcisa Walker, 1869
Sesamia albivena Hampson, 1902
Sesamia sabulosa Hampson, 1910
Soloe fumipennis Hampson, 1910
Soloella orientis Kühne, 2007
Sphingomorpha chlorea (Cramer, 1777)
Spodoptera exempta (Walker, 1857)
Spodoptera littoralis (Boisduval, 1833)
Syngrapha circumflexa (Linnaeus, 1767)
Thiacidas senex (Bethune-Baker, 1911)
Thysanoplusia chalcedona (Hampson, 1902)
Thysanoplusia cupreomicans (Hampson, 1909)
Thysanoplusia rostrata (D. S. Fletcher, 1963)
Thysanoplusia sestertia (Felder & Rogenhofer, 1874)
Timora margarita Le Cerf, 1911
Trachea atriplaga Hampson, 1911
Tracheplexia amaranta (Felder & Rogenhofer, 1974)
Tracheplexia schista D. S. Fletcher, 1961
Trichoplusia orichalcea (Fabricius, 1775)
Trigonodes hyppasia (Cramer, 1779)
Ugia scopulina Hampson, 1926
Uncula tristigmatias (Hampson, 1902)
Vietteania pyrostrota (Hampson, 1907)
Vittaplusia petraea Dufay, 1972
Xanthomera leucoglene (Mabille, 1880)
Xylostola olivata Hampson, 1909

Nolidae
Earias cupreoviridis (Walker, 1862)
Eligma duplicata Aurivillius, 1892
Maurilia arcuata (Walker, [1858])
Meganola reubeni Agassiz, 2009
Nola costimaculata Kiriakoff, 1958
Nola melaleuca (Hampson, 1901)
Nola ochrographa Hampson, 1907
Plusiocalpe pallida Holland, 1894
Trogobriga albifera Hampson, 1912
Westermannia argyroplaga Hampson, 1905

Notodontidae
Amphiphalera leuconephra Hampson, 1910
Amphiphalera nigripuncta Kiriakoff, 1975
Antheua anomala Berio, 1937
Antheua eriostepta Tams, 1932
Antheua ochriventris (Strand, 1912)
Antheua trifasciata (Hampson, 1909)
Bugandita bisignata Kiriakoff, 1965
Desmeocraera adusta Kiriakoff, 1962
Desmeocraera analis Kiriakoff, 1954
Desmeocraera dambae (Bethune-Baker, 1913)
Desmeocraera esmeraldina Kiriakoff, 1958
Desmeocraera geminata Gaede, 1928
Desmeocraera gonerilla Kiriakoff, 1973
Desmeocraera jucunda Kiriakoff, 1968
Desmeocraera minima Kiriakoff, 1962
Desmeocraera oliva Kiriakoff, 1968
Diopeithes barnesi Kiriakoff, 1958
Epanaphe moloneyi (Druce, 1887)
Odontoperas dentigera Kiriakoff, 1962
Oreocerura dissodectes (Kiriakoff, 1958)
Pararheneades plumosa Kiriakoff, 1965
Peratodonta gypsitea (Kiriakoff, 1968)
Peratodonta nigriventris Kiriakoff, 1962
Phalera atrata (Grünberg, 1907)
Polienus capillata (Wallengren, 1875)
Rasemia citaria (Schaus, 1893)
Rasemia euzopherodes (Hampson, 1910)
Rasemia macrodonta (Hampson, 1909)
Rhenea monotonia Kiriakoff, 1965
Rheneades flavescens Kiriakoff, 1962
Scalmicauda corinna Kiriakoff, 1968
Scalmicauda tricolor Kiriakoff, 1965
Sidisca zika Kiriakoff, 1962
Stenostaura impeditus (Walker, 1865)
Xanthodonta diatrecta (Hampson, 1910)

Oecophoridae
Diocosma rhodopola Meyrick, 1930

Psychidae
Eumeta rougeoti Bourgogne, 1955
Monda bicolor Strand, 1911
Monda immunda Joicey & Talbot, 1924
Monda junctimacula Hampson, 1910

Pterophoridae
Agdistis malitiosa Meyrick, 1909
Agdistis obstinata Meyrick, 1920
Apoxyptilus anthites (Meyrick, 1936)
Cosmoclostis chalconota D. S. Fletcher, 1947
Deuterocopus deltoptilus Meyrick, 1930
Exelastis crudipennis (Meyrick, 1932)
Fletcherella niphadarcha (Meyrick, 1930)
Hellinsia ecstaticus (Meyrick, 1932)
Megalorhipida leucodactylus (Fabricius, 1794)
Picardia eparches (Meyrick, 1931)
Platyptilia interpres Meyrick, 1922
Platyptilia melitroctis Meyrick, 1924
Platyptilia molopias Meyrick, 1906
Platyptilia rhyncholoba Meyrick, 1924
Platyptilia strictiformis Meyrick, 1932
Pterophorus albidus (Zeller, 1852)

Pyralidae
Acracona elgonae Whalley, 1964
Ematheudes neonepsia Martin, 1956
Ematheudes straminella Snellen, 1872
Endotricha ellisoni Whalley, 1963
Hypsopygia mauritialis (Boisduval, 1833)
Paraglossa atrisquamalis Hampson, 1906
Tyndis proteanalis Hampson, 1906

Saturniidae
Aurivillius seydeli Rougeot, 1962
Aurivillius xerophilus Rougeot, 1977
Bunaea alcinoe (Stoll, 1780)
Bunaeopsis hersilia (Westwood, 1849)
Bunaeopsis jacksoni (Jordan, 1908)
Bunaeopsis licharbas (Maassen & Weymer, 1885)
Bunaeopsis oubie (Guérin-Méneville, 1849)
Campimoptilum kuntzei (Dewitz, 1881)
Decachorda pomona (Weymer, 1892)
Epiphora antinorii (Oberthür, 1880)
Epiphora intermedia (Rougeot, 1955)
Epiphora lugardi Kirby, 1894
Epiphora marginimacula Joicey & Talbot, 1924
Epiphora rectifascia Rothschild, 1907
Epiphora vacuna (Westwood, 1849)
Gonimbrasia rectilineata (Sonthonnax, 1899)
Goodia oxytela Jordan, 1922
Goodia unguiculata Bouvier, 1936
Gynanisa uganda Darge, 2008
Holocerina smilax (Westwood, 1849)
Imbrasia epimethea (Drury, 1772)
Lobobunaea acetes (Westwood, 1849)
Lobobunaea goodi (Holland, 1893)
Lobobunaea phaedusa (Drury, 1782)
Ludia hansali Felder, 1874
Ludia orinoptena Karsch, 1892
Micragone cana (Aurivillius, 1893)
Micragone elisabethae Bouvier, 1930
Nudaurelia alopia Westwood, 1849
Nudaurelia anthinoides Rougeot, 1978
Nudaurelia dione (Fabricius, 1793)
Nudaurelia eblis Strecker, 1876
Orthogonioptilum adiegetum Karsch, 1892
Orthogonioptilum vestigiata (Holland, 1893)
Pseudantheraea imperator Rougeot, 1962
Pseudaphelia ansorgei Rothschild, 1898
Pseudaphelia apollinaris (Boisduval, 1847)
Pseudaphelia luteola Bouvier, 1930
Pseudimbrasia deyrollei (J. Thomson, 1858)
Pseudobunaea cleopatra (Aurivillius, 1893)
Pseudobunaea tyrrhena (Westwood, 1849)
Tagoropsis flavinata (Walker, 1865)
Tagoropsis hanningtoni (Butler, 1883)
Tagoropsis rougeoti D. S. Fletcher, 1952
Urota centralis Bouyer, 2008
Yatanga smithi (Holland, 1892)

Sesiidae
Aegeria ferox Meyrick, 1929
Camaegeria aristura (Meyrick, 1931)
Camaegeria sophax (Druce, 1899)
Cryptomima hampsoni Butler, 1902
Homogyna porphyractis Meyrick, 1937
Hymenosphecia albomaculata Le Cerf, 1917
Melittia acosmetes Hampson, 1919
Melittia aureosquamata (Wallengren, 1863)
Melittia auriplumia Hampson, 1910
Melittia occidentalis Le Cerf, 1917
Paranthrene xanthopyga Hampson, 1919
Paranthrene xanthosoma (Hampson, 1910)
Sura lampadura Meyrick, 1935
Tipulamima flammipes (Hampson, 1910)
Tipulamima pyrosoma Hampson, 1919

Sphingidae
Acanthosphinx guessfeldti (Dewitz, 1879)
Agrius convolvuli (Linnaeus, 1758)
Antinephele achlora Holland, 1893
Antinephele anomala (Butler, 1882)
Antinephele maculifera Holland, 1889
Antinephele marcida Holland, 1893
Basiothia aureata (Karsch, 1891)
Centroctena rutherfordi (Druce, 1882)
Cephonodes hylas (Linnaeus, 1771)
Chaerocina dohertyi Rothschild & Jordan, 1903
Chloroclanis virescens (Butler, 1882)
Dovania poecila Rothschild & Jordan, 1903
Falcatula cymatodes (Rothschild & Jordan, 1912)
Falcatula falcata (Rothschild & Jordan, 1903)
Hippotion aporodes Rothschild & Jordan, 1912
Hippotion celerio (Linnaeus, 1758)
Hippotion irregularis (Walker, 1856)
Hippotion rebeli Rothschild & Jordan, 1903
Hippotion roseipennis (Butler, 1882)
Hypaedalea butleri Rothschild, 1894
Hypaedalea lobipennis Strand, 1913
Leucophlebia afra Karsch, 1891
Leucophlebia neumanni Rothschild, 1902
Lophostethus dumolinii (Angas, 1849)
Lycosphingia hamatus (Dewitz, 1879)
Macroglossum trochilus (Hübner, 1823)
Neopolyptychus prionites (Rothschild & Jordan, 1916)
Neopolyptychus serrator (Jordan, 1929)
Nephele bipartita Butler, 1878
Nephele discifera Karsch, 1891
Nephele maculosa Rothschild & Jordan, 1903
Nephele monostigma Clark, 1925
Nephele rectangulata Rothschild, 1895
Nephele rosae Butler, 1875
Pantophaea jordani (Joicey & Talbot, 1916)
Phylloxiphia formosa (Schultze, 1914)
Phylloxiphia illustris (Rothschild & Jordan, 1906)
Platysphinx constrigilis (Walker, 1869)
Platysphinx stigmatica (Mabille, 1878)
Poliana buchholzi (Plötz, 1880)
Polyptychoides digitatus (Karsch, 1891)
Polyptychus affinis Rothschild & Jordan, 1903
Polyptychus andosa Walker, 1856
Polyptychus carteri (Butler, 1882)
Polyptychus hollandi Rothschild & Jordan, 1903
Polyptychus nigriplaga Rothschild & Jordan, 1903
Polyptychus orthographus Rothschild & Jordan, 1903
Polyptychus paupercula (Holland, 1889)
Polyptychus trisecta (Aurivillius, 1901)
Praedora marshalli Rothschild & Jordan, 1903
Pseudoclanis molitor (Rothschild & Jordan, 1912)
Pseudoclanis occidentalis Rothschild & Jordan, 1903
Pseudoclanis rhadamistus (Fabricius, 1781)
Rufoclanis rosea (Druce, 1882)
Temnora albilinea Rothschild, 1904
Temnora atrofasciata Holland, 1889
Temnora crenulata (Holland, 1893)
Temnora curtula Rothschild & Jordan, 1908
Temnora elegans (Rothschild, 1895)
Temnora elisabethae Hering, 1930
Temnora eranga (Holland, 1889)
Temnora funebris (Holland, 1893)
Temnora griseata Rothschild & Jordan, 1903
Temnora hollandi Clark, 1920
Temnora iapygoides (Holland, 1889)
Temnora livida (Holland, 1889)
Temnora plagiata Walker, 1856
Temnora pseudopylas (Rothschild, 1894)
Temnora pylades Rothschild & Jordan, 1903
Temnora rattrayi Rothschild, 1904
Temnora sardanus (Walker, 1856)
Temnora scheveni Carcasson, 1968
Temnora scitula (Holland, 1889)
Temnora spiritus (Holland, 1893)
Temnora zantus (Herrich-Schäffer, 1854)
Theretra jugurtha (Boisduval, 1875)
Theretra orpheus (Herrich-Schäffer, 1854)
Theretra perkeo Rothschild & Jordan, 1903

Thyrididae
Arniocera cyanoxantha (Mabille, 1893)
Arniocera poecila Jordan, 1907
Cecidothyris affinia Whalley, 1971
Chrysotypus circumfuscus Whalley, 1971
Chrysotypus dawsoni Distant, 1897
Chrysotypus vittiferalis (Gaede, 1917)
Dysodia fenestratella Warren, 1900
Dysodia intermedia (Walker, 1865)
Dysodia magnifica Whalley, 1968
Dysodia zelleri (Dewitz, 1881)
Hypolamprus distrinctus Whalley, 1971
Kalenga ansorgei (Warren, 1899)
Kuja kibala Whalley, 1971
Lamprochrysa scintillans (Butler, 1893)
Lamprochrysa triplex (Plötz, 1880)
Lelymena misalis Karsch, 1900
Marmax semiaurata (Walker, 1854)
Marmax smaragdina (Butler, 1888)
Marmax vicaria (Walker, 1854)
Nemea ankole Whalley, 1971
Nemea nivosa Whalley, 1971
Netrocera setioides Felder, 1874
Rhodoneura serraticornis (Warren, 1899)
Trichobaptes auristrigata (Plötz, 1880)
Tridesmodes ramiculata Warren, 1899

Tineidae
Acridotarsa melipecta (Meyrick, 1915)
Afrocelestis minuta (Gozmány, 1965)
Ceratophaga vastellus (Zeller, 1852)
Ceratophaga xanthastis (Meyrick, 1908)
Cimitra estimata (Gozmány, 1965)
Cimitra fetialis (Meyrick, 1917)
Cimitra platyloxa (Meyrick, 1930)
Cimitra spinignatha (Gozmány, 1968)
Criticonoma esoterica (Gozmány, 1966)
Crypsithyris miranda (Gozmány, 1966)
Crypsithyris ruwenzorica (Gozmány, 1966)
Cylicobathra chionarga Meyrick, 1920
Dasyses incrustata (Meyrick, 1930)
Dinica diana Gozmány, 1966
Dinica hyacinthopa (Meyrick, 1932)
Dinica orphnospila (Meyrick, 1934)
Ectabola deviata (Gozmány, 1966)
Edosa ensigera (Gozmány, 1966)
Emblematodes aberrans Gozmány, 1966
Hapsifera refalcata Gozmány, 1967
Hapsifera revoluta Meyrick, 1914
Hoplocentra mucronata Gozmány, 1968
Hyperbola bradleyi Gozmány, 1966
Leptozancla cultellata Gozmány & Vári, 1973
Machaeropteris irritabilis Meyrick, 1932
Monopis liparota Meyrick, 1920
Monopis malescripta Meyrick, 1938
Monopis megalodelta Meyrick, 1908
Monopis persimilis Gozmány, 1965
Monopis sciagrapha Bradley, 1965
Morophaga capnochalca (Meyrick, 1932)
Morophaga soror Gozmány, 1965
Organodesma leucomicra (Gozmány, 1966)
Organodesma ornata Gozmány, 1966
Perissomastix breviberbis (Meyrick, 1933)
Perissomastix ruwenzorica Gozmány & Vári, 1973
Phalloscardia semiumbrata (Meyrick, 1920)
Phereoeca barysticta (Meyrick, 1927)
Phthoropoea oenochares (Meyrick, 1920)
Phthoropoea pycnosaris (Meyrick, 1932)
Pitharcha atrisecta (Meyrick, 1918)
Pitharcha chalinaea Meyrick, 1908
Scalmatica ascendens Gozmány, 1966
Scalmatica zernyi Gozmány, 1967
Silosca hypsocola Gozmány, 1968
Silosca licziae Gozmány, 1967
Silosca savannae Gozmány, 1968
Sphallestasis epixena (Gozmány, 1966)
Sphallestasis extraphalla (Gozmány, 1966)
Sphallestasis fletcheri (Gozmány, 1966)
Sphallestasis sinuosa (Gozmány, 1966)
Tinea allomella Bradley, 1965
Tinea amphitrite Meyrick, 1932
Tinemelitta ceriaula (Meyrick, 1914)
Tineola bisselliella (Hummel, 1823)
Tinissa poliophasma Bradley, 1965
Tinissa ruwenzorica Gozmány, 1966
Tiquadra lichenea Walsingham, 1897
Wegneria astragalodes (Meyrick, 1922)
Wegneria chrysophthalma (Meyrick, 1934)
Xerantica tephroclysta Meyrick, 1930

Tortricidae
Acleris chloroma Razowski, 1993
Acleris ruwenzorica Razowski, 2005
Acleris thylacitis (Meyrick, 1920)
Actihema fibigeri Aarvik, 2010
Actihema jirani Aarvik, 2010
Apolobesia sitophaga (Meyrick, 1922)
Astronauta stellans (Meyrick, 1922)
Bactra philocherda Diakonoff, 1964
Bactra tylophora Diakonoff, 1963
Brachioxena sparactis (Meyrick, 1928)
Capua arctophaea Meyrick, 1924
Capua pusillana (Walker, 1863)
Capua spilonoma Meyrick, 1932
Clepsis stenophora (Bradley, 1965)
Cornips dryocausta (Meyrick, 1938)
Cosmorrhyncha microcosma Aarvik, 2004
Crimnologa fletcheri Bradley, 1965
Crocidosema plebejana Zeller, 1847
Cryptaspasma caryothicta (Meyrick, 1920)
Cryptophlebia semilunana (Saalmüller, 1880)
Cydia stelosema (Meyrick, 1931)
Diceratura complicana Aarvik, 2010
Dichrorampha excisa Walsingham, 1891
Dinogenes meteoropa Meyrick, 1934
Eccopsis nebulana Walsingham, 1891
Eccopsis wahlbergiana Zeller, 1852
Endothenia alpigena Bradley, 1965
Endothenia nephelopsycha (Meyrick, 1934)
Epichoristodes atycta Bradley, 1965
Epichoristodes heterotropha Bradley, 1965
Epichoristodes panochra Bradley, 1965
Episimus cyanitis Meyrick, 1932
Eucosma cremastropis Meyrick, 1930
Eucosma orthopeda Meyrick, 1934
Eucosma plumbaginea Meyrick, 1931
Eugnosta marginana Aarvik, 2010
Eupoecilia kruegeriana Razowski, 1993
Hypsidracon saurodoxa Meyrick, 1934
Lozotaenia edwardsi (Bradley, 1965)
Megalota archana Aarvik, 2004
Metamesia elegans (Walsingham, 1881)
Metamesia endopyrrha (Meyrick, 1930)
Metamesia octogona Bradley, 1965
Metamesia physetopa (Meyrick, 1932)
Niphothixa ophina Bradley, 1965
Notocelia scotodes Bradley, 1965
Olethreutes phyllodoxa (Meyrick, 1932)
Olethreutes pontifraga (Meyrick, 1928)
Olethreutes rhodochranta (Meyrick, 1933)
Olethreutes vinculigera (Meyrick, 1939)
Pandemis cerioschema (Meyrick, 1934)
Pandemis eustropha (Bradley, 1965)
Pandemis orophila (Bradley, 1965)
Paramesiodes aprepta Bradley, 1965
Phalarocarpa harmographa Meyrick, 1937
Procrica ophiograpta (Meyrick, 1932)
Sycacantha nereidopa (Meyrick, 1927)
Sycacantha penthrana (Bradley, 1965)
Thaumatotibia leucotreta (Meyrick, 1913)
Tortrix chalicodes Meyrick, 1920
Tortrix dinota Meyrick, 1918
Trachybyrsis euglypta Meyrick, 1927
Trachybyrsis hypsitropha Bradley, 1965

Uraniidae
Aploschema albaria (Plötz, 1880)
Dissoprumna erycinaria (Guenée, 1857)
Epiplema barbara Warren, 1899

Zygaenidae
Astyloneura difformis (Jordan, 1907)
Astyloneura esmeralda (Hampson, 1920)
Astyloneura nitens Jordan, 1907
Chalconycles vetulina Jordan, 1907
Epiorna abessynica (Koch, 1865)
Saliunca aenescens Hampson, 1920
Saliunca chalconota Hampson, 1920
Saliunca cyanea Hampson, 1920
Saliunca cyanothorax Hampson, 1920
Saliunca egeria Bethune-Baker, 1913
Saliunca flavifrons (Plötz, 1880)
Saliunca homochroa (Holland, 1897)
Saliunca sapphirina Hampson, 1920
Saliunca styx (Fabricius, 1775)
Saliunca ugandana Jordan, 1908
Saliunca ventralis Jordan, 1907
Syringura triplex (Plötz, 1880)

References

External links 

Moths
Moths
Uganda
Uganda